Provincial elections were held in Argentina in 1997.

Corrientes

Governor

Deputies

Senate

References 

Provincial elections in Argentina
1997 in Argentina